Rannock is a rural community in the central north part of the Riverina.

Rannock Post Office opened on 21 December 1908 and closed in 1970.

Gallery

Notes and references

Towns in the Riverina
Towns in New South Wales
Coolamon Shire